Chikkanayakanahalli Assembly constituency is one of the 224 constituencies in the Karnataka Legislative Assembly of Karnataka a south state of India. It is also part of Tumkur Lok Sabha constituency.

Members of Legislative Assembly

Mysore State
 1951: C. H. Lingadevaru, Indian National Congress

 1957: C. K. Rajaiasetty, Praja Socialist Party

 1962: C. H. Lingadevaru, Indian National Congress

 1967: C. K. Rajaiasetty, Praja Socialist Party

 1972: N. Basavaiah, Indian National Congress (Organisation)

Karnataka State
 1978: N. Basavaiah, Indian National Congress (Indira)

 1983: S. G. Ramalingaiah, Bharatiya Janata Party

 1985: B. Lakkappa, Indian National Congress

 1989: J. C. Madhuswamy, Janata Dal

 1994: N. Basavaiah, Karnataka Congress Party

 1997 (By-Poll): J. C. Madhuswamy, Independent

 1999: C. B. Suresh Babu, Janata Dal (Secular)

 2004: J. C. Madhuswamy, Janata Dal (United)

 2008: C. B. Suresh Babu, Janata Dal (Secular)

 2013: C. B. Suresh Babu, Janata Dal (Secular)

See also
 List of constituencies of Karnataka Legislative Assembly
 Tumkur district

References

Assembly constituencies of Karnataka
Tumkur district